Dear Myself is a Japanese manga written and illustrated by Eiki Eiki, with a sequel, World's End. They are licensed in North America by Digital Manga Publishing which released Dear Myself in August 2006 and World's End in October 2007. They are licensed in France by Asuka and in Germany by Egmont Manga.

Reception
Andrea Lipinski, writing for School Library Journal recommended Dear Myself for grades 10 and up, describing it as "a thought-provoking story for mature readers". Danielle Van Gorder, writing about World's End for Mania Entertainment, noted that Eiki Eiki's artistic strength was in her drawings of eyes, but felt that the shifting personalities of the protagonists did not come off as being natural, and that their relationship shifted from being healthy to being "codependent". Holly Ellingwood, writing for Active Anime, enjoyed the "layered character development" of World's End compared to other yaoi manga. Jason Thompson, writing for the appendix to Manga: The Complete Guide, felt that World's End "reaches new depths in Eiki Eiki's glorification of pathological behavior".

References

External links

1998 manga
1999 manga
Digital Manga Publishing titles
Eiki Eiki
Shinshokan manga
Yaoi anime and manga